Prof. Chittaranjan Yajnik is a  medical scientist from Pune, India who is a specialist in Diabetes research and maternal nutrition.

Yajnik is  known for his work on the topic of the ‘thin-fat’ Indian, which explains that though not obese by international criteria Indians are adipose (high body fat percent). He has worked in the field of intrauterine programming of diabetes and was successful in showing possible role of maternal micronutrient nutrition in its aetiology.

External links
 Profile of Dr. Yajnik at WHO website
 A presentation by Dr. Yajnik regarding the concept of 'Thin Fat Indian'

References 

Indian diabetologists
Medical doctors from Maharashtra